Pyewacket was one of the supposed familiar spirits of an alleged witch accused by the witchfinder general Matthew Hopkins in March 1644 in the town of Manningtree, Essex, England.  Hopkins claimed he spied on the witches as they held their meeting close by his house, and heard them mention the name of a local woman. She was arrested and deprived of sleep for four nights, at the end of which she confessed and called out the names of her familiars, describing the forms in which they should appear. They were:

Holt, "who came in like a white kittling"
Jarmara, "who came in like a fat Spaniel without any legs at all"
Vinegar Tom, "who was like a long-legg'd greyhound, with a head like an Oxe"
Sacke and Sugar, "like a black Rabbet"
Newes, "like a Polecat"
Elemanzer, Pyewacket, Peck in the Crown, Grizzel Greedigut, described as imps

Hopkins claims he and nine other witnesses saw the first five of these, which appeared in the forms described by the witch. Only the first of these was in the form of a cat; the next two were dogs, and the others were a black rabbit and a polecat – so Pyewacket was, presumably, not a cat's name. As for the other familiars, Hopkins says only that they were such that "no mortall could invent." The incident is described in Hopkins's pamphlet "The Discovery of Witches" (1647).

In film and fiction 

In the Hollywood film Bell, Book and Candle (1958) Pyewacket is the name of the brown sealpoint Siamese cat/familiar of Gillian Holroyd, a witch played by Kim Novak.  The film was adapted from a 1958 Broadway play that continues to be produced in community theatres.

In the 1967 children's novel Pyewacket the title character and protagonist is an alley cat.

Fantasy author Dianne Sylvan’s “Shadow World” series features a Wiccan character, Stella, whose cat is named Pyewacket after the film. 

Pyewacket is a 2017 horror film.

References

External links
The Discovery of Witches at Project Gutenberg

English legendary creatures
Witchcraft in England
Fictional cats
Manningtree